Glenn Edward Thibeault  (born October 23, 1969) is a former Canadian politician. He was Liberal member of the Legislative Assembly of Ontario from 2015 to 2018 who represented the riding of Sudbury. He served as a cabinet minister in the government of Kathleen Wynne. From 2008 to 2015, he represented the federal electoral district of Sudbury in the House of Commons of Canada as a member of the New Democratic Party.

On December 16, 2014, Thibeault announced that he would be resigning from the House of Commons in order to run for the provincial Ontario Liberal Party in a by-election in the provincial riding of Sudbury for a seat in the Ontario legislature after being recruited by Ontario Premier Kathleen Wynne. His resignation became official on January 5, 2015, shortly before Wynne called the by-election. He won the by-election on February 5, 2015 but was defeated in the general election in 2018.

Background 
Thibeault was born in Sudbury, and was a newscaster and reporter at local stations CIGM and CJRQ during the 1990s. He later graduated from the developmental services worker program at Cambrian College, and was hired as a behavioural consultant for the West Vancouver School Board in British Columbia. He worked for five years as coordinator at the Mainstream Association for Pro-Active Community Living in Vancouver, and returned to Sudbury in 2003 to become campaign director of the United Way of Sudbury and District. In June 2005, he was promoted to executive director.  The United Way held several successful campaigns in this period, increasing its total from $1.3 million in 2003 to $2.3 million in 2007.

Federal politics 
Thibeault won the New Democratic Party's Sudbury nomination in September 2008, after the resignation of previously nominated candidate Gerry McIntaggart and the withdrawal of Dave Battaino from the contest.  He received endorsements from the Sudbury Star newspaper, the Sudbury and District Labour Council and United Steelworkers of America Local 2020, and won an upset victory over six-term Liberal Party incumbent Diane Marleau.

The Conservative Party won a minority government in this election, and Thibeault entered parliament as a member of the opposition. He was appointed as his party's critic for consumer protection and amateur sport in late November 2008.  Along with other New Democratic Party MPs, he later called for an investigation into the Canadian Food Inspection Agency's handling of tainted milk that was sold in Sudbury and other parts of Ontario.  Thibeault supported a planned coalition government of Liberals and New Democrats in late 2008, and wrote an editorial describing Conservative Prime Minister Stephen Harper as a "coward" for proroguing parliament when it appeared his government would be defeated by the coalition in a motion of non-confidence.  The coalition was abandoned when Michael Ignatieff became Liberal Party leader, and decided to support the Conservative government's January 2009 budget.

Thibeault called on the federal government to regulate interest rates and fees on credit cards and debit cards in March 2009, describing existing rates as "out of control" and a hindrance to consumers and businesses during an economic downturn.  Finance Minister Jim Flaherty later announced that his government would launch an education campaign and provide for increased disclosure on credit-card statements, but would not regulate rates. Thibeault described this as "disappointing". On June 18, 2010, Thibeault introduced a private member's bill to cap annual interest rates on credit cards to no more than five per cent above the current Bank of Canada target for overnight rates.

Thibeault also introduced a private member's bill in April 2009 to ensure the cost of Applied Behavioural Analysis (ABA) and Intensive Behavioural Intervention (IBI) for autistic persons is provided by health insurance programs in every province.  He later introduced another private bill to have the third Saturday in June recognized as Emergency Services Appreciation Day in Canada.

Thibeault stood with striking workers from Vale Inco in the summer of 2009, and criticized Industry Minister Tony Clement's announcement that the federal government would not intervene to stop job and production cuts in Sudbury.  He called for Clement's resignation after the minister stated that Vale had "saved Sudbury" from becoming a "Valley of Death" by purchasing Inco in 2006.  He also protested cuts to the Canadian Broadcasting Corporation's Northern Ontario radio services in this period.

Thibeault, as the New Democrat critic for Sport, has been instrumental in raising national awareness about the very serious increase of violence in amateur sport and the ongoing concussion epidemic plaguing amateur hockey. He called for a Royal Commission to study violence in sports in February 2010; his call has been echoed by others, including Jaime Watt, a conservative strategist. In February 2011, Thibeault introduced Bill C-616, calling for a national strategy to reduce the incidence of serious injury in amateur sport.

He was successfully re-elected in the 2011 election. The next year he supported Thomas Mulcair's successful bid to become leader of the NDP. Thibeault served as caucus chairperson from April 2014 until resigning on December 2, 2014 citing family reasons.

Provincial politics 
Thibeault supported Gilles Bisson's bid to lead the Ontario New Democratic Party at its 2009 leadership convention.

Following the resignation of Ontario NDP Sudbury Member of Provincial Parliament Joe Cimino, Thibeault announced on December 16, 2014, that he would be resigning as an NDP MP in order to run in the upcoming by-election in the provincial Sudbury riding as the Ontario Liberal Party's candidate after being appointed the party's candidate by Premier Kathleen Wynne. His appointment faced some controversy when Andrew Olivier, the party's candidate in the 2014 election, alleged that he had been offered a job or appointment by party strategists in exchange for withdrawing his candidacy from the nomination contest, although Thibeault himself was never personally implicated in the allegations.

Thibeault was a Parliamentary Assistant to the Minister of Environment and Climate Change from 2015 to 2016.

On June 13, 2016, Thibeault replaced Bob Chiarelli as Minister of Energy in a Liberal cabinet shuffle.

Cabinet positions

Electoral record

References

External links 
 
 

1969 births
21st-century Canadian politicians
Cambrian College alumni
Canadian radio journalists
Fanshawe College alumni
Franco-Ontarian people
Living people
Members of the House of Commons of Canada from Ontario
Members of the Executive Council of Ontario
New Democratic Party MPs
Ontario Liberal Party MPPs
Politicians from Greater Sudbury